George Ogilvie Belden (March 28, 1797 – October 9, 1833) was an American lawyer and politician who served one term as and a U.S. Representative from New York from 1827 to 1829.

Biography
Born in Norwalk, Connecticut,  Belden attended the public schools. He was admitted to the bar and practiced in Monticello, New York.

Tenure in Congress 
Belden was elected as a Jacksonian to the Twentieth Congress and served as U. S. Representative for the seventh district of New York from March 4, 1827, to March 3, 1829.

Later career 
Afterward, Belden resumed the practice of law. He served as general of the Twenty-third Brigade of Infantry of the State of New York in 1831.

Death
Belden died in Monticello, Sullivan County, New York, on October 9, 1833 (age 36 years, 195 days). He is interred at Old Cemetery on St. John Street, Monticello, New York.

References

External links 

1797 births
1833 deaths
New York (state) lawyers
American militia generals
Politicians from Norwalk, Connecticut
People from Monticello, New York
Jacksonian members of the United States House of Representatives from New York (state)
19th-century American politicians
Members of the United States House of Representatives from New York (state)